The Salina Liberty are a professional indoor football team based in Salina, Kansas. They began play in 2016 as members of the Champions Indoor Football (CIF). The team plays their home games at the Tony’s Pizza Events Center.

History
Indoor football in Salina started in 2012 as the Salina Bombers, an expansion franchise for the Champions Professional Indoor Football League (CPIFL), were announced for the 2013 season. The Bombers then joined Champions Indoor Football (CIF) due to a merger between the CPIFL and the Lone Star Football League for 2015. However, during their first season in the CIF, the league ejected the Bombers for a "business violation" on May 28 and they would cease operations later that month. In July 2015, the CIF announced it had replaced the Bombers with a new expansion team in Salina called the Salina Liberty.

The Liberty began play in the 2016 season of the CIF where they went 2–10, finishing last in the Northern Division and failing to qualify for the playoffs. The Liberty finished first in the CIF's North Conference regular season in 2018 and 2019. They won the conference playoff championship in 2019 and played in the Champions Bowl for the league title, but lost to the Duke City Gladiators 29–35.

Roster

Season-by-season results

References

External links
 Salina Liberty official website

American football teams in Kansas
Champions Indoor Football teams
Sports teams in Kansas
Sports in Salina, Kansas
American football teams established in 2015
2015 establishments in Kansas